Netball in Niue is a popular local sport. Games are most often played by girls on Saturdays between June and August, though games can be played at all times of the year. Most of the netball is played on high school athletic grounds.

History
Although initially considered a women's sport, the popularity of netball is growing amongst men on the island, as sport is an important way of villages keeping in touch with each other.

There are several words for netball in the Niue language.  They include neteplo, pelê neteplo, pelê.

Continuing growth of the game in the region was at times hampered by the fact that the sport is not an Olympic one. For Olympic sports, money can be tapped to help cover costs for inter-island travel for international competitions. The lack of netball being recognized meant it was hard to find money to cover these costs.

Competition
Vanuatu, Tonga, Niue, the Solomon Islands, and the Cook Islands are all very competitive with each other in netball.  This competitive streak is fought out at the Pacific Games.

References

Bibliography

External links 
Oceania Sport